This is a list of films produced by Daiei Film. Daiei was established in 1942 under its original title of the Greater Japan Motion Picture Production Company (Dai Nihon Eiga Seisaku Kabukishikigaisha). The company's early output consisted primarily of war propaganda films. The company began submitting its films to overseas festivals in the early 1950s with titles such as Akira Kurosawa's Rashomon, Kenji Mizoguchi's Ugetsu and Teinosuke Kinugasa's Gate of Hell, which all won awards internationally. Other productions during the 1950s and 1960s included their horror (ghost) films and the long-running Zatoichi series starring Katsu Shintaro. The company also created kaiju eiga during this period to rival the popular Toho Godzilla series with Gamera and Daimajin. 

Towards the late 1960s, Daiei was suffering from severe financial difficulties and merged with Nikkatsu temporarily in June 1970 until Nikkatsu withdrew in August 1971. By 1974, Daiei was being run as a rental studio, as it was assimilated as a subsidiary of Tokuma Shoten Publishing Company. Daiei continued on with reduced production during this period. In the 1990s, few films from Daiei reached overseas markets; these included Shall We Dance? and a new Gamera trilogy. In 2002, Kadokawa Shoten acquired Daiei's back catalog and renamed the company Kadokawa-Daiei Motion Picture Company. In 2004, it dropped the name Daiei and is now simply known as Kadokawa Pictures.

Films
This list compiles the films by their original release date, their common English titles and Japanese titles. The Japanese titles are not necessarily direct translations of their English counterparts.

See also
Tsuburaya Productions
Toho
Daiei Film
Nikkatsu
Toei Company
Shochiku
Shintoho

Footnotes

Sources

 
 
 
 
 
 
 

Daiei Film films